Cook's Corner is an Orange County, California bar built in 1884 that is popular with motorcyclists. It is located between the city of Lake Forest and the unincorporated community of Silverado. Cook's Corner is situated at the intersection of Santiago Canyon and Trabuco Canyon.

History
The building is named for Andrew Jackson Cook, a merchant who acquired  of land in the South Orange County area. The building was constructed not long after, in 1884. In 1926, Cook's son, Earl Jack "E.J." Cook, converted the structure into a restaurant meant to supply food to miners and local ranchers. Seven years later, after the end of the Prohibition period, alcohol began being sold again, and Cook's was converted into a bar. 
The Cook family sold Cook's, which included the bar, the Cook's family house, and about 40 acres of land to two owners, Victor Villa and Volker Streicek, of the Santa Ana, California based motorcycle accessories company Cheat'ah Engineering in 1975. The Cook family purchased a ranch in Montana and moved out of Southern California. Volker and Victor had founded Cheat'ah Engineering in 1969, along with Ron Rondeau. They purchased Cook's as an investment, but also as a place where motorcycle clubs could gather in peace. Volker and Victor were proud of the fact that Cook's was a place to party with very few fights between motorcycle clubs and patrons. The owners established a policy where no motorcycle club colors were allowed at Cook's. Cook's became one of the more famous social places for bikers in Southern California.
Volker and his wife Shirley ran the bar in the late 70's, before moving to Colorado. Victor and Volker sold Cook's in the 1980s.
Volker died on March 29, 2011, in Kelowna, British Columbia, Canada. Victor still lives in Southern California.

Cook's today
Today's Cook's Corner is a wooden structure similar to a World War II-era restaurant and bar. The property includes a pool table, outdoor recreational area for horseshoe games, as well as trails for mountain biking and hiking. The majority of bikers come to Cook's Corner on the weekends, when Cook's hosts a number of events, mainly dealing with motorcycles, including the "CHOC ride of 2006," and the "9/11 Remembrance ride." 
On the first Sunday of May each year,

about 2,000 come for the annual Blessing of the Bikes given by a priest of nearby St. Michael's Abbey.

In May 2006, Governor Arnold Schwarzenegger made a stop in Orange County, and ate at Cook's Corner. During the California wildfires of October 2007, newscasters reporting on the Santiago Fire ate lunch at Cook's Corner, as well as firefighters working to control the blaze.

In May 2008, a small-scale landslide destroyed a large section of the famous outdoor patio. ABC 7 and NBC 4 were among some of the news teams that broadcast the event. Damages were somewhat minor, and the repairs took just a few days.

See also

 Biker bar
 List of public house topics

References

Notes

References

External links

Cook's Corner's website

Biker bars
Motorcycling subculture in the United States
Orange County, California culture
Santa Ana Mountains
Restaurants in Orange County, California
Restaurants established in 1926
Houses completed in 1884
Trabuco Canyon, California